John Blunden may refer to:

John Blunden (politician) (c. 1695–1752), Irish MP for Kilkenny City 1727–1752
Sir John Blunden, 1st Baronet (c. 1718–1783), Irish MP for Kilkenny City 1761–1776
Sir John Blunden, 2nd Baronet (1767–1818), of the Blunden baronets
Sir John Blunden, 3rd Baronet (1814–1890), of the Blunden baronets
Sir John Blunden, 5th Baronet (1880–1923), of the Blunden baronets

See also
Blunden